The opening ceremony of the 2018 Winter Paralympics took place at the Pyeongchang Olympic Stadium in Pyeongchang, South Korea on March 9, 2018. at 20:00 KST

Preparations
The site of the opening ceremony, Pyeongchang Olympic Stadium, was built specifically for the games. It seated 35,000. No Olympic or Paralympic events were held there. It was only used for the opening and closing ceremonies.

Proceedings

Parade of Nations

Competing countries entered the stadium in alphabetical order based on their names in the Korean language, with the host country, South Korea, concluding the march. Coincidentally similar to the Olympics, Greece enters at the start of the parade.

Dignitaries in attendance 
  President of Korea Moon Jae-in and First Lady Kim Jung-Sook
  United States Secretary of Homeland Security Kirstjen Nielsen

Anthems
 Korean Wheelchair Choir – South Korean National Anthem
 Seoul Philharmonic Orchestra – Paralympic Hymn

See also
 2018 Winter Paralympics closing ceremony
 2018 Winter Olympics opening ceremony
 2018 Winter Olympics closing ceremony
 1988 Summer Olympics opening ceremony
 1988 Summer Olympics closing ceremony

References

Opening Ceremony
Ceremonies in South Korea
Paralympics opening ceremonies